The Reiherstieg is an anabranch of the river Elbe in the Port of Hamburg, Germany.

It connects the Süderelbe and the Norderelbe. To avoid tideflow, its natural mouths are closed by locks, although the middle access through the Rethe basin isn't locked.

See also
List of rivers of Hamburg

Rivers of Hamburg
Rivers of Germany